Desert orange tip or desert orangetip may refer to the following butterflies:

Anthocharis cethura of the southwestern United States and northern Mexico
Colotis evagore of Africa, southern Spain and southwest Arabia
Colotis liagore of northern Africa and across to Pakistan

Animal common name disambiguation pages